Lady Luck, a personification of luck, may refer to:

Fiction and mythology 
 Fortuna, in Roman mythology, goddess of fortune
 Tyche, in Greek mythology, goddess of fortune
 Lady Luck (comics), a character created by Will Eisner

Film 
 Lady Luck (1936 film), a film directed by Charles Lamont
 Lady Luck (1942 film) or Lucky Ghost, a film directed by William Beaudine
 Lady Luck (1946 film), a film directed by Edwin L. Marin
 Lady Luck, a 1973 television film starring Bert Convy

Music 
 Lady Luck (rapper) (born 1983), American rapper
 Lady Luck (album), by Broadzilla, 2001

Songs 
 "Lady Luck" (Jamie Woon song), 2011
 "Lady Luck"/"Dilly Dally", a single by After School, 2012
 "Lady Luck", by the 69 Eyes from Savage Garden
 "Lady Luck", by David Lee Roth from A Little Ain't Enough
 "Lady Luck", by Deep Purple from Come Taste the Band
 "Lady Luck", by Drag from The Way Out
 "Lady Luck", by Exo from Exodus
 "Lady Luck", by J.J. Cale from Travel-Log
 "Lady Luck", by Journey from Evolution
 "Lady Luck", by Kenny Loggins from Celebrate Me Home
 "Lady Luck", by Lloyd Price
 "Lady Luck", by the Proclaimers from The Best of The Proclaimers
 "Lady Luck", by Rod Stewart from A Spanner in the Works
 "Lady Luck", by Tesla from The Great Radio Controversy
 "Lady Luck", composed by Ray Perkins, from the 1929 film The Show of Shows

Places and businesses 
 Lady Luck Casino Caruthersville, Missouri, US
 Lady Luck Casino Vicksburg, now Casino Vicksburg, Mississippi, US
 Lady Luck Gaming, a defunct company in Las Vegas, Nevada, US
 Lady Luck Hotel & Casino, now Downtown Grand, Las Vegas, Nevada, US
 Lady Luck Casino Marquette, now Casino Queen Marquette, Iowa, US
 Lady Luck Casino Nemacolin, at Nemacolin Woodlands Resort, Farmington, Pennsylvania, US

Other uses
 "Lady Luck", a special prize awarded at the Kinoschock film festival in Russia

See also 
 "Luck Be a Lady", a song from the musical Guys and Dolls, also covered by Frank Sinatra and many others